Milton Stapp Robinson (April 20, 1832 – July 28, 1892) was an Indiana lawyer, politician, judge, and soldier. He was a brigade commander in the Union Army during the American Civil War and a postbellum U.S. Representative, serving two terms from 1875 to 1879.

Biography
During the Civil War, he entered the Union Army in September 1861 as the lieutenant colonel of the 47th Indiana Infantry. Soon  he was promoted to colonel of the 75th Indiana Infantry, which he led during the December 1862 Battle of Stones River near Murfreesboro, Tennessee. Robinson then commanded the 2nd Brigade, 4th Division of the XIV Corps at the September 1863 Battle of Chickamauga. He was brevetted as a brigadier general in the omnibus promotions at the end of the war, dating from March 13, 1865.

After the war, he served in the Indiana State Senate 1866-1870. He was delegate to the 1872 Republican National Convention.

Congress 
Robinson was elected as a Republican to the Forty-fourth and Forty-fifth Congresses (March 4, 1875 – March 3, 1879). He was not a candidate for renomination in 1878 and resumed the practice of law in Madison County, Indiana.

Judicial career 
Robinson was appointed associate justice of the appellate court of Indiana in March 1891. He was subsequently appointed chief justice and served until his death in Anderson, Indiana, on July 28, 1892.

He was interred in Maplewood Cemetery.

References
 Retrieved on 2008-11-01

External links

Robinson's house in Anderson, Indiana

1832 births
1892 deaths
19th-century American politicians
Indiana lawyers
Indiana state court judges
Republican Party Indiana state senators
Republican Party members of the United States House of Representatives from Indiana
People of Indiana in the American Civil War
People from Versailles, Indiana
People from Madison County, Indiana
Union Army colonels
19th-century American judges
19th-century American lawyers